The Servant in the House is a lost 1921 American silent drama film directed by Jack Conway based on a 1908 Broadway play, The Servant in the House by Charles Rann Kennedy.

Cast
Jean Hersholt as Manson, The Servant
Jack Curtis as Robert Smith
Claire Anderson as Mary Smith
Clara Horton as Mary Smith, Her Daughter
Zenaide Williams as Martha, The Vicar's Wife
Edward Peil, Sr. as William Smythe, The Vicar
Harvey Clark as The Bishop of Lancashire
John Gilbert (as Jack Gilbert) as Percival
Anna Dodge (as Mrs. George Hernandez) as Janitress

Production
This film was shot in 1918 by the historic Triangle Film Corporation and has a checkered distribution history. By 1920, Triangle had gone out of business. The film had a limited release in mid-1920 and was acquired by a different distributor, Film Booking Offices of America, in late 1920 for re-release in 1921.

References

External links

1921 films
American silent feature films
Lost American films
Films directed by Jack Conway
1921 drama films
Silent American drama films
American black-and-white films
Film Booking Offices of America films
1921 lost films
Lost drama films
1920s American films